Raúl Albentosa Redal (born 7 September 1988) is a Spanish professional footballer who plays as a centre-back for Danish Superliga club Vejle Boldklub.

Club career
Born in Alzira, Valencia, Albentosa played youth football with local Elche CF, making his senior debut in 2007–08 season with the B team in the Tercera División. On 15 June 2008 he played his first official game with the main squad, starting in a 1–0 away loss against Xerez CD.

In August 2009, Albentosa was loaned to Caravaca CF. He returned to Elche in January of the following year, however, and appeared in a further two matches in the Segunda División until the end of the campaign.

In the following years, Albentosa did not settle with any team. He competed in the fourth tier with Real Murcia Imperial, representing CD San Roque de Lepe and Cádiz CF in the Segunda División B.

On 21 July 2013, Albentosa signed with SD Eibar, recently promoted to the second division. He scored his first professional goal on 2 March of the following year, the last in a 3–0 home victory over Sporting de Gijón.

Albentosa made 33 appearances in 2013–14, helping the Armeros achieve promotion to La Liga for the first time ever. He made his debut in the competition on 24 August 2014, starting in a 1–0 home defeat of Real Sociedad. On 19 September, through a header, he scored his first goal in the top flight, his being the second in a 2–0 win at Elche CF.

On 16 January 2015, Albentosa signed for Derby County on a -year deal, after the English club paid the €600,000 of his buyout clause. He made his competitive debut for his new team eight days later, playing the first half of a 2–0 home victory against Chesterfield in the fourth round of the FA Cup.

Albentosa returned to Spain and its top division in the summer of 2015, after agreeing to a one-year loan deal with Málaga CF. On 9 July 2016, he signed a permanent four-year contract with fellow league club Deportivo de La Coruña.

On 31 August 2018, after suffering relegation, Albentosa was loaned to Gimnàstic de Tarragona in the second division, for one year. He was recalled the following January, terminating his contract shortly after.

Albentosa moved abroad again in late July 2019, with the 30-year-old joining PFC CSKA Sofia of the First Professional Football League (Bulgaria). He played his first competitive match on 2 August in a 1–0 away loss to NK Osijek in the second qualifying round of the UEFA Europa League, and scored his first goal two months later in the 2–2 Eternal Derby draw against PFC Levski Sofia.

In April 2020, Albentosa left the Stadion Balgarska Armia by mutual consent. He moved to Romania with FC Dinamo București one year later, scoring his only Liga I goal on 2 May against FC Viitorul Constanța and leaving at the end of the season.

On 12 January 2022, Albentosa signed with Danish Superliga club Vejle Boldklub.

Honours
Eibar
Segunda División: 2013–14

References

External links

1988 births
Living people
People from Alzira, Valencia
Sportspeople from the Province of Valencia
Spanish footballers
Footballers from the Valencian Community
Association football defenders
La Liga players
Segunda División players
Segunda División B players
Tercera División players
Divisiones Regionales de Fútbol players
Elche CF Ilicitano footballers
Elche CF players
Caravaca CF players
Real Murcia Imperial players
CD San Roque de Lepe footballers
Cádiz CF players
SD Eibar footballers
Málaga CF players
Deportivo de La Coruña players
Gimnàstic de Tarragona footballers
English Football League players
Derby County F.C. players
First Professional Football League (Bulgaria) players
PFC CSKA Sofia players
Liga I players
FC Dinamo București players
Danish Superliga players
Vejle Boldklub players
Spanish expatriate footballers
Expatriate footballers in England
Expatriate footballers in Bulgaria
Expatriate footballers in Romania
Expatriate men's footballers in Denmark
Spanish expatriate sportspeople in England
Spanish expatriate sportspeople in Bulgaria
Spanish expatriate sportspeople in Romania
Spanish expatriate sportspeople in Denmark